The Canton of Fécamp is a canton in the Seine-Maritime département and in the Normandy region of northern France.

Geography 
Fécamp is an area of fishing, farming, quarrying and light industry in the arrondissement of Le Havre, centred on a port of Fécamp.

Composition 
At the French canton reorganisation which came into effect in March 2015, the canton was expanded from 13 to 35 communes:

Ancretteville-sur-Mer
Angerville-la-Martel
Colleville
Contremoulins
Criquebeuf-en-Caux
Criquetot-le-Mauconduit
Écretteville-sur-Mer
Életot
Épreville
Fécamp
Froberville
Ganzeville
Gerponville
Gerville
Limpiville
Les Loges
Maniquerville
Riville
Sainte-Hélène-Bondeville
Saint-Léonard
Saint-Pierre-en-Port
Sassetot-le-Mauconduit
Senneville-sur-Fécamp
Sorquainville
Thérouldeville
Theuville-aux-Maillots
Thiergeville
Thiétreville
Tourville-les-Ifs
Toussaint
Valmont
Vattetot-sur-Mer
Vinnemerville
Yport 
Ypreville-Biville

Population

See also 
 Arrondissements of the Seine-Maritime department
 Cantons of the Seine-Maritime department
 Communes of the Seine-Maritime department

References

Fecamp